Dignity Health St. Joseph's Hospital and Medical Center is a hospital in Phoenix, Arizona, United States, operated by Dignity Health. St. Joseph's is a 607-bed, not-for-profit hospital that provides a wide range of health, social and support services, with special advocacy for the poor and underserved. It is home to the Barrow Neurological Institute, the world's largest dedicated neurosurgical center and a renowned leader in neurosurgical training, research, and patient care.

Services 
St. Joseph's is a center for tertiary care, medical education and research. It includes the Barrow Neurological Institute, the Heart & Lung Institute, and a Level I Trauma Center verified by the American College of Surgeons. The hospital is also a center for maternity care, orthopedics, oncology and many other medical services.

History 
The Sisters of Mercy came to Phoenix in 1892 to open a parish school. They were successful in that endeavor, but were also affected deeply by the suffering of tuberculosis victims. Realizing the most pressing need of the community, the Sisters expanded their original mission and began fund-raising to be able to establish a sanitarium.

Their efforts paid off. They collected enough money to rent a six-bedroom brick cottage at Fourth and Polk Streets in January 1895. They equipped each room with two beds for tuberculosis patients and created quarters for themselves in the living room. St. Joseph's Sanitarium was born.

Two months later, the Sisters had raised sufficient funds to build a "real hospital." On March 19, 1895, a stake was driven into the ground to mark the site of what would become a hospital housing 24 private rooms that opened onto porches.

Through the years, there were additions to that building, of course, and a devastating fire in 1917, after which the building was reconstructed in just 90 days. The rebuilt facility was adequate for the community for the next 30 years, but the local population was continuing to grow significantly. In 1930, the population of Phoenix was 48,118. By 1945, it had reached nearly 100,000. St. Joseph's Hospital needed a larger facility.

In the mid-1940s, the Sisters purchased  of land at Third Avenue and Thomas Road which was then part of an old dairy farm. They were criticized for choosing land so far north of the city, literally out in the country. But the Sisters had foresight and a keen understanding of a good business deal. Those 10 acres cost just $25,000.

In November 1947, a fundraising campaign began to raise money to build the new hospital. The facility opened in July 1953.

In 2010, Bishop Thomas Olmsted revoked the hospital's affiliation with the Roman Catholic Church in a controversy over medical procedures and church teachings (see below).

Facilities 
St. Joseph's Hospital also has a Lung Transplant Program, which offers transplants to those individuals diagnosed with high-risk lung diseases. The program is offered through the Center of Thoracic Transplantation and has received accreditation from the Centers for Medicare and Medicaid Services (CMS). On April 13, 2007, the hospital performed the first recorded lung transplant in Phoenix, Arizona. Since then, more than 170 such transplants have been conducted by the program.

Barrow Neurological Institute 
St. Joseph's Hospital and Medical Center is home to the Barrow neurological institute (BNI), a nationally ranked program in neurology and neurosurgery. The BNI has the largest neurosurgery residency program in the United States, as of 2013. The current director of the BNI is vascular neurosurgeon Robert F. Spetzler, a position he has held since 1986.

Centers for Clinical Research 
Dignity Health currently supports 16 internal Institutional Review Boards providing oversight for more than  1,000 clinical trials across the system. Dignity's Human Research Protection Office provides for the regulatory and compliance oversight of all research conducted at Dignity.

Controversies 

The hospital in late 2009 had as a patient a mother of four who was 11 weeks pregnant and suffering from a severe case of pulmonary hypertension. Doctors estimated that her chance of dying if she continued the pregnancy was "close to 100 percent". An ethics board approved an abortion to save the life of the mother, even though the hospital was Catholic and within the Diocese of Phoenix. A religious sister, Sister Margaret Mary McBride, who was a vice president at the hospital and who concurred in the decision, was excommunicated by Thomas Olmsted, the Bishop of Phoenix.  The case stirred intense debate from within and outside the area. McBride was later returned to good standing with the church, her religious community, and the hospital.

Bishop Olmsted asked Catholic Healthcare West to provide a moral analysis of the case.  He later issued a decree on 21 December 2010 revoking the hospital's affiliation with the Catholic Church, after months of discussion had failed to induce the hospital management to refuse to perform similar abortions in the future. Olmsted wrote that he could not verify that the hospital provides health care consistent with "authentic Catholic moral teaching."

References

External links 
 

Hospital buildings completed in 1953
Hospitals in Arizona
Dignity Health
Christian hospitals
Buildings and structures in Phoenix, Arizona